Alberto Bolzi (18 March 1924 – 7 February 2012) was an Argentine wrestler. He competed in the men's Greco-Roman middleweight at the 1948 Summer Olympics.

References

External links
 

1924 births
2012 deaths
Argentine male sport wrestlers
Olympic wrestlers of Argentina
Wrestlers at the 1948 Summer Olympics
Place of birth missing